Decaprenyl-diphosphate synthase subunit 2 (PDSS2) is a protein that in humans is encoded by the PDSS2 gene.

Function 

The protein encoded by this gene is an enzyme that synthesizes the prenyl side-chain of coenzyme Q, or ubiquinone, one of the key elements in the respiratory chain. The gene product catalyzes the formation of all trans-polyprenyl pyrophosphates from isopentyl diphosphate in the assembly of polyisoprenoid side chains, the first step in coenzyme Q biosynthesis.

Clinical significance 

It may be associated with Coenzyme Q10 deficiency.

See also 
 PDSS1

References

Further reading

EC 2.5.1